Giorgos Valavanidis (born February 16, 1974, in Germany) is a retired Greek professional basketball player.

Professional career
Valavanidis's origin is from Alexandroupoli and was raised in the local club of Feres, Evros. He started his career from there and transferred to PAOK in 1988. He played with PAOK'S youth teams and he promoted to the first team in 1991. Valavanidis was member of the team which won the Saporta Cup 1991, at the age of 17. He played with PAOK, until 1994 and he won the Greek League championship in 1992, and FIBA Korać Cup in 1994. In 1994 Valavanidis moved to MENT, and he played for six years. After 2000 he played with several clubs such as Xanthi, Kolossos, Xanthi, Panorama, Aias Evosmou and Apollon Kalamarias. In 2010 Valanidis returned to PAOK and became coach at club's academies.

Greek national team
Valavanidis won the silver game at the FIBA Europe Under-16 Championship. He also played at the 1992 FIBA Europe Under-18 Championship and won the fourth place.

References

External links 
at eok.gr
at fibaeurope

1974 births
Living people
Greek men's basketball players
Kolossos Rodou B.C. players
MENT B.C. players
P.A.O.K. BC players
Xanthi B.C. players
Sportspeople from Alexandroupolis
Centers (basketball)